Pljeskavica is a Serbian grilled dish consisting of a spiced meat patty mixture of pork, beef and lamb. It is one of the national dishes of Serbia and is very popular in the neighbouring Balkan and former Yugoslavian countries of Bosnia and Herzegovina, Croatia, and Montenegro. It is a main course served with onions, kajmak (milk cream), ajvar (relish), and urnebes (spicy cheese salad), either on plate with side dishes, or with lepinja (flatbread, as a type of hamburger). Recently, pljeskavica has gained popularity elsewhere in Europe and is served in a few speciality fast food restaurants in Germany, Sweden, and Austria. Varieties include the "Leskovac pljeskavica" (Leskovačka pljeskavica), very spicy with onions; "Šar pljeskavica" (Šarska pljeskavica), stuffed with kačkavalj cheese; "Hajduk pljeskavica" (Hajdučka pljeskavica), of beef mixed with smoked pork meat; and "Vranje pljeskavica" (Vranjanska pljeskavica).

Since 2008 the name "Leskovac pljeskavica" has been a legally protected term for pljeskavica from the Jablanica District of Serbia.

See also
Ćevapi
Hamburger
Salisbury steak

References

External links

Hamburgers (food)
Balkan cuisine
Barbecue